Reine Ngameni Mbopda Davina (born ) is a Cameroonian female volleyball player. 
She is a member of the Cameroon women's national volleyball team.  

She was part of the Cameroonian national team at the 2018 Montreux Volley Masters,  and 2018 FIVB Volleyball Women's World Championship.

Clubs 

  Bafia Evolution (2018)

References

External links 

 FIVB profile
 http://www.worldofvolley.com/Latest_news/FIVB/101198/wch-2018-w-cameroon-moved-from-slovenia-to-japan.html

2002 births
Living people
Cameroonian women's volleyball players
Place of birth missing (living people)
Liberos
21st-century Cameroonian women